Daniel Umpiérrez (Tacuarembó, 1974) also known as Dani Umpi, is a Uruguayan artist, musician and writer.

Biography 

He was born in Tacuarembó, Uruguay, on 1 November 1974, to a Catholic family dedicated to ecumenical activities. He studied in the San Javier Jesuit college He is living in Montevideo since 1993.

As a musician, he has collaborated with Luciano Supervielle, Max Capote, Patricia Curzio, Carlos Perciavale, Wendy Sulca and Fito Paez, to name a few.

Books

Discography 

In his second record (Dramática), a collaboration with Adrián Soiza on acoustic guitar and Dani Umpi on vocals, they cover pop and rock classics, like Valeria Lynch, Ace of Base, Fun People and Pet Shop Boys.

External links 

 Dani Umpi – Página con Música.
 Dani Umpi – Página del Disco Perfecto, para bajar gratuitamente.
 Entrevista a Dani Umpi.
 Dani Umpi – El juego de la silla (por Hernán Panessi).

1974 births
Living people
Uruguayan gay writers
Uruguayan gay musicians
Uruguayan musicians
Uruguayan novelists
Uruguayan LGBT novelists
Gay novelists
Uruguayan male writers
People from Tacuarembó
21st-century novelists
21st-century Uruguayan male writers
21st-century Uruguayan LGBT people